Washington Crossing the Delaware is a 1953 painting by the New York painter Larry Rivers. Made of charcoal, oil paint and linen, it is painted on linen and is in the collection of the Museum of Modern Art in New York City. In 1958, it was damaged by fire. In his autobiography, Rivers claimed it was not a variation on the 1851 painting with the same name by Emanuel Leutze but an Americanized reflection on Leo Tolstoy's War and Peace and a subversion of the abstract Impressionism of the time.

References

Paintings about the American Revolution
Modern paintings
1953 paintings
George Washington in art
1953 painting